55 Steps is a 2017 German-Belgian drama film directed by Bille August and starring Helena Bonham Carter, Hilary Swank, and Jeffrey Tambor. The film is based on the true story of Eleanor Riese.

Premise
The story is about a woman committed to a mental health facility. Prior to 1987, it was assumed that the Lanterman–Petris–Short Act allowed involuntary treatment for those who were detained under an initial three-day hold (for evaluation and treatment) and a subsequent fourteen-day hospitalization (for those patients declared after the three-day hold to be dangerous to themselves or others or gravely disabled). In 1987, in Riese v. St. Mary's Hospital and Medical Center, the California State Court of Appeals declared that these patients had the right to exercise informed consent regarding the use of antipsychotic drugs, except in an emergency, and if they rejected medication "a judicial determination of their incapacity to make treatment decisions" was required before they could be involuntarily treated. This case was a class action suit brought in the name of patient Eleanor Riese by the California ACLU.

Cast

Release
The film had its world premiere in the Gala Presentations section at the 2017 Toronto International Film Festival. Its theatrical release began in Germany on 3 May 2018.

Reception

Critical response
On review aggregator Rotten Tomatoes, the film holds an approval rating of 50% based on 8 reviews, with an average rating of 6.83/10. On Metacritic, the film has a weighted average score of 42 out of 100, based on 4 critics, indicating "mixed or average reviews".

References

External links
 
 

2017 films
2017 drama films
2010s English-language films
English-language Belgian films
English-language German films
Films directed by Bille August
Belgian drama films
German drama films
2010s German films